John C. Williamson (September 15, 1912 – October 11, 1998) was an American politician who served in the California State Assembly for the 39th and 29th district from 1959 to 1967. During World War II he served in the United States Army.

References

1912 births
1998 deaths
Democratic Party members of the California State Assembly
United States Army personnel of World War II